Valjok Church is a parish church of the Church of Norway in Karasjok Municipality in Troms og Finnmark county, Norway. It is located in the village of Váljohka. It is an annex chapel for the Karasjok parish which is part of the Indre Finnmark prosti (deanery) in the Diocese of Nord-Hålogaland.

The small, red, wooden church was built in a long church style in 1932 by the architect Harald Sund. The church was built to serve the inhabitants in the northeastern part of the municipality, along the Tana River. The church seats about 60 people. The interior colouring is remarkable, with strong red and blue detail set against golden, unpainted woodwork. These are interpreted as the traditional colours of the gákti (the traditional Sami costume) and they are a standard feature of Sami décor.

See also
List of churches in Nord-Hålogaland

References

Karasjok
Churches in Finnmark
Wooden churches in Norway
20th-century Church of Norway church buildings
Churches completed in 1932
1932 establishments in Norway
Long churches in Norway